Matheus Vieira Campos Peixoto (born 16 November 1995) is a Brazilian footballer who plays for Ceará, on loan from Metalist Kharkiv as a forward.

Career statistics

References

External links

1995 births
Living people
Brazilian footballers
Association football midfielders
Campeonato Brasileiro Série A players
Campeonato Brasileiro Série B players
Campeonato Brasileiro Série C players
Ukrainian First League players
Brazilian expatriate footballers
Expatriate footballers in Ukraine
Brazilian expatriate sportspeople in Ukraine
Audax Rio de Janeiro Esporte Clube players
Esporte Clube Bahia players
Fluminense de Feira Futebol Clube players
Clube Atlético Bragantino players
Sport Club do Recife players
Red Bull Bragantino players
Esporte Clube Juventude players
FC Metalist Kharkiv players
Ceará Sporting Club players